Santiago Schnell FRSC is a Venezuelan theoretical and mathematical biologist. He is the William K. Warren Foundation Dean of the College of Science at the University of Notre Dame, as well as a professor in the Department of Biological Sciences, and Department of Applied and Computational Mathematics and Statistics. Before this, he was the Chair of the Department of Molecular & Integrative Physiology and the John A. Jacquez Collegiate Professor of Physiology at the University of Michigan. He was also Professor of Computational Medicine & Bioinformatics at the same institution. 

Schnell's research program departs from the premise that there is a continuum between health and disease; if we are capable of measuring this continuum, we will be in the position of detecting disease earlier and understanding it better to intervene more precisely. His research focuses on two broad areas: (i) the development of standard-methods to obtain high quality measurements in the biomedical sciences and scientometrics, and (ii) the development of mathematical models of complex biomedical systems with the goal of identifying the key mechanisms underlying the behavior of the system as a whole.

Career

Education 

Schnell received his initial training in biological science from Universidad Simón Bolívar in Venezuela and doctorate in mathematical biology from the University of Oxford, England, United Kingdom.  He pursued his doctoral and postdoctoral research under the supervision of Philip Maini, FRS in the Wolfson Centre for Mathematical Biology at the University of Oxford.

Professional Work 
From 2001 to 2004, he was Junior Research Fellow at Christ Church (a college of the University of Oxford) and a Research Fellow of the Welcome Trust at the Center for Mathematical Biology in the University of Oxford.  He was Assistant Professor of Informatics and Associate Director of the Biocomplexity Institute at Indiana University, Bloomington between 2004 and 2008.  In 2008, he joined the University of Michigan as Associate Professor of Molecular & Integrative Physiology and a U-M Brehm Investigator in the Brehm Center for Diabetes Research. In 2013, he was jointly appointed as associate professor in the Department of Computational Medicine and Bioinformatics.  He was promoted to professor in both departments in 2015, appointed as the John A. Jacquez Collegiate Professor of Physiology in 2016, and served as chair of the Department of Molecular & Integrative Physiology between 2017 and 2021.

Schnell is Past-President of the Society for Mathematical Biology.  He serves as the Editor-in-Chief of Mathematical Biosciences, and is a member of the Standards for Reporting Enzymology Data Commission.

Research 

Schnell systematically investigated for the first time how the rate laws describing intracellular reactions vary as a function of the physico-chemical conditions of the intracellular environments.  His work has focused to resolve the ambiguities in the quantitative analysis and modeling of reactions inside cells.  He has also focused his research attention on deriving mathematical expressions to estimate enzyme kinetics parameters under different reaction conditions. He has systematically obtained equations to estimate kinetic parameters for the family of Michaelis-Menten reaction mechanisms and determined their region of validity for the initial enzyme and substrate concentrations.  Schnell derived a generic expression, known nowadays as the Schnell-Mendoza equation, to determine the Michaelis constant and maximum velocity for enzyme catalyzed reactions following Michaelis-Menten kinetics using time course data.

In addition, Schnell has also extensive experience in developing multiscale models of developmental processes and cancer. His work has been highlighted in popular science magazines, such as American Scientist (USA), Investigación y Ciencia (Spain and Latin-America), Spektrum der Wissenschaft (Germany).

Teaching and Outreach 
Schnell received the Faculty Award for Teaching Excellence from the School of Informatics at Indiana University in 2006. In 2013, he was inducted to the League of Educational Excellence in the University of Michigan Medical School, and was awarded the Endowment for Basic Science Teaching Award from the same institution. He was also Visiting Professor of Excellence, Department of Chemistry, University of Barcelona, Barcelona, Spain.  

As a member the Hispanic and hidden disability communities, Schnell is actively promoting involvement of Hispanic, other minorities and disable people in science.  He is a life member of the Society for the Advancement of Hispanics/Chicanos and Native Americans in Science.

In 2021, Schnell established the Notre Dame Christmas lectures; this event is an annual gift of science to the community adapted the Royal Institution Christmas Lectures.

Publications 
He has published over 150 articles in academic journals, edited several special issues and a book.  His most highly cited publications include:
 T. E. Turner, S. Schnell and K. Burrage (2004). Stochastic approaches for modelling in vivo reactions. Computational Biology and Chemistry 28, 165–178. 
 S. Schnell and T. E. Turner (2004). Reaction kinetics in intracellular environments with macromolecular crowding: simulations and rate laws. Progress in Biophysics and Molecular Biology 85, 235–260. 
 E. J. Crampin, S. Schnell and P. McSharry (2004). Mathematical and computational techniques to deduce complex biochemical reaction mechanisms. Progress in Biophysics and Molecular Biology 86, 77-112. 
 S. Schnell and C. Mendoza (1997). A closed-form solution for time-dependent enzyme kinetic. Journal of theoretical Biology 187, 207–212. 
 B. Ribba, T. Collin and S. Schnell (2006). A multiscale mathematical model of cancer, and its use in analyzing irradiation therapies. Theoretical Biology and Medical Modelling 3, 7. 
 S. Schnell and P. K. Maini (2003). A century of enzyme kinetics: Reliability of the KM and vmax estimates. Comments on Theoretical Biology 8, 169–187. 
 S. Schnell and P. K. Maini (2000). Enzyme kinetics at high enzyme concentration. Bulletin of Mathematical Biology 62, 483–499. 
 S. Schnell and C. Mendoza (1997). Enzymological considerations for a theoretical description of the Quantitative Competitive Polymerase Chain Reaction (QC-PCR). Journal of theoretical Biology 184, 433–440. 
 S. Schnell and C. Mendoza (1997). Theoretical description for polymerase chain reaction. Journal of theoretical Biology 188, 313–318. 
 S. Schnell and P. K. Maini (2000). Clock and induction model for somitogenesis. Developmental Dynamics 217, 415–420. 
 R. Grima and S. Schnell (2006). A systematic investigation of the rate laws valid in intracellular environments. Biophysical Chemistry 124, 1-10.

Sources

External links
 Fast moving fronts 2009
 Santiago Schnell
 Schnell Lab at the University of Notre Dame

Theoretical biologists
Venezuelan biologists
Simón Bolívar University (Venezuela) alumni
Living people
University of Michigan faculty
Computational chemists
1971 births
es:SANTIAGO SCHNELL